Naso is a Sicilian surname. Notable people with the surname include:
Bob Naso (born 1937), American college football coach
Gianluca Naso (born 1987), Italian tennis player
Joseph Naso (born 1934), American serial killer
Lucius Antonius Naso, Roman tribune from the 1st century AD 
Marcus Actorius Naso, Roman writer from the 1st century BC 
Ovid (43 BC – AD 17), also known as Publius Ovidius Naso